The Hulsean Lectures were established from an endowment made by John Hulse to the University of Cambridge in 1790.  At present, they consist of a series of four to eight lectures given by a university graduate on some branch of Christian theology.

History
The lectures were originally to be given by a "learned and ingenious clergyman" from Cambridge, holding the degree of Master of Arts, who was under the age of forty years.  The terms for the lectures were quite extensive and particular.  The lecturer was

As a result of these rather demanding terms and conditions, for some thirty years (1790–1819) no person could be found who would undertake the office of this lectureship.  The first to accept was Christopher Benson, who held the post until 1822, at which time he quit, having found the terms and conditions imposed by the lectureship too fatiguing and laborious.  For the rest of the decade, only two more lecturers were found, and both in their turn resigned for the same reasons.  Finally, in 1830, after the post had remained vacant for three years, the Court of Chancery reduced the number of lectures to be given in a year to eight and extended the deadline for publishing the lectures to one year following the delivery of the last lecture.
In 1860 the number of lectures was further reduced to a minimum of four.  Also changed at this time was the length of appointment to one year, with the possibility of reappointment after an interval of five years; the lecturer need not be a clergyman, but simply have some higher degree from Cambridge and be at least thirty years of age; and the necessity of printing or publishing the lectures was done away with.  The topic was somewhat simplified to something that would show the evidence for Revealed Religion, or to explain some of the most difficult texts or obscure parts of Holy Scripture.  Finally, by 1952 the topic was changed to its present wording, "on some branch of Christian Theology", and the office of the lectureship was extended to two years.

The following list of lectures has been compiled from a number of different sources.

Lecturers

1820–1850
 1820 — Christopher Benson, Hulsean lectures for 1820: Twenty discourses preached before the University of Cambridge in the year 1820, at the lecture founded by the Rev. John Hulse
 1821 — James Clarke Franks,  On the evidences of Christianity, as they were stated and enforced in the discourses of our Lord: comprising a connected view of the claims which Jesus advanced, of the arguments by which he supported them, and of his statements respecting the causes, progress, and consequences of infidelity
 1822 — Christopher Benson,  On Scripture Difficulties
 1823 — James Clarke Franks, On the apostolical preaching and vindication of the gospel to the Jews, Samaritans, and devout Gentiles: as exhibited in the Acts of the Apostles, the Epistles of St. Peter, and the Epistle to the Hebrews
 1824 — No appointment
 1825 — No appointment
 1826 — Temple Chevallier,  On the historical types contained in the Old Testament
 1827 — Temple Chevallier,  On the proofs of divine power and wisdom: derived from the study of astronomy ; and on the evidence, doctrines, and precepts of revealed religion
 1828 — No appointment
 1829 — No appointment
 1830 — No appointment
 1831 — John James Blunt,  The veracity of the historical books of the Old Testament: from the conclusion of the Pentateuch, to the opening of the prophets, argued from the undesigned coincidences to be found in them, when compared in their several parts: being a continuation of the argument for the veracity of the five books of Moses
 1832 — John James Blunt, Principles for the proper understanding of the Mosaic writings stated and applied: together with an incidental argument for the truth of the resurrection of our Lord
 1833 — Henry John Rose,  The Law of Moses viewed in connexion with the History and Character of the Jews: with a defence of the book of Joshua against professor Leo of Berlin
 1834 — No appointment
 1835 — Henry Howarth, The truth and obligation of revealed religion, considered with reference to prevailing opinions
 1836 — Henry Howarth,  Jesus of Nazareth, the Christ of God
 1837 — Richard Parkinson, Rationalism and Revelation: or, The testimony of moral philosophy, the system of nature, and the constitution of man, to the truth of the doctrines of Scripture
 1838 — Richard Parkinson,  The constitution of the visible church of Christ : considered, under the heads of authority and inspiration of scripture; creeds, tradition; articles of religion; heresy and schism; state-alliance, preaching, and national education 
 1839 — Theyre Townsend Smith,  Man's responsibility in reference to his religious belief
 1840 — Theyre Townsend Smith, The Christian religion in connexion with the principles of morality
 1841 — Henry Alford, The consistency of the Divine conduct in revealing of the doctrines of redemption
 1842 — Henry Alford, The consistency of the Divine conduct in revealing of the doctrines of redemption: part the second
 1843 — John Howard Marsden, An examination of certain passages in our Lord's conversation with Nicodemus
 1844 — John Howard Marsden,  The evils which have resulted at various times from a misapprehension of our Lord's miracles
 1845 — Richard Chenevix Trench, The fitness of Holy Scripture for unfolding the spiritual life of men
 1846 — Richard Chenevix Trench, Christ the Desire of all Nations: or, The unconscious prophecies of heathendom
 1847 — Christopher Wordsworth, On the Canon of the Scriptures of the Old and New Testament, and on the Apocrypha
 1848 — Christopher Wordsworth,  Lectures on the Apocalypse: critical, expository, and practical
 1849 — William Gilson Humphry,  The Doctrine of a Future State
 1850 — William Gilson Humphry,  The Early Progress of the Gospel

1851–1875
 1851 — George Currey, The preparation of the gospel as exhibited in the history of the Israelites
 1852 — George Currey, The confirmation of faith by reason and authority
 1853 — Benjamin Morgan Cowie, Scripture difficulties: four sermons preached before the University of Cambridge, in April, 1853, at the lecture founded by the Rev. John Hulse
 1854 — Benjamin Morgan Cowie, Scripture difficulties: sermons preached before the University of Cambridge, including the Hulsean lectures for 1854
 1855 — Harvey Goodwin, The Doctrines and Difficulties of the Christian Faith contemplated from the standing ground afforded by the Catholic doctrine of the being of our Lord Jesus Christ
 1856 — Harvey Goodwin, The Glory of the Only Begotten of the Father seen in the manhood of Christ
 1857 — Charles Anthony Swainson, The Creeds of the Church, in their relations to the word of God and to the conscience of the Christian
 1858 — Charles Anthony Swainson, The Authority of the New Testament, the Conviction of Righteousness, and the Ministry of Reconciliation
 1859 — Charles John Ellicott, Historical Lectures on the Life of Our Lord Jesus Christ
 1860 — John Lamb, The Seven Words spoken against the Lord Jesus: or an investigation of the motives which led his contemporaries to reject him
 1861 — Charles Merivale, not published
 1862 — John Saul Howson, The Character of St. Paul
 1863 — Francis Morse, not published
 1864 — Daniel Moore,  The Age and the Gospel
 1865 — James Moorhouse, Our Lord Jesus Christ the Subject of Growth in Wisdom
 1866 — Edward Henry Perowne, The Godhead of Jesus
 1867 — Charles Pritchard,  Analogies in the Progress of Nature and Grace
 1868 — John James Stewart Perowne, Immortality
 1869 — John Venn,  On Some of the Characteristics of Belief: Scientific and Religious
 1870 — Frederic William Farrar, The Witness of History to Christ
 1871 — Fenton John Anthony Hort, The Way The Truth The Life
 1872 — Josiah Brown Pearson, not published
 1873 — Stanley Leathes,  The Gospel its own Witness
 1874 — George Martin Straffen, Sin, as set forth in Holy Scripture
 1875 — Edward Thomas Vaughan Some Reasons of our Christian Hope

1876–1900
 1876 — Edwin Abbott Abbott, Through Nature to Christ: or, The Ascent of Worship Through Illusion to the Truth
 1877 — George Smith Drew,  The Human Life of Christ: Revealing the Order of the Universe
 1878 — William Boyd Carpenter, The Witness of the Heart to Christ
 1879 — Vincent Henry Stanton, The Jewish and the Christian Messiah: a study in the earliest history of Christianity
 1880 — Thomas Thomason Perowne, "The Intercession of Christ, or our Lord's present work in Heaven as High Priest of His Church, as it is revealed in Holy Scripture, and in its bearing on the worship of the Church on earth" (not published)
 1881 — Joseph Foxley, Secularism, Scepticism, Ritualism, Liberationism
 1882 — Frederick Watson, The Law and the Prophets
 1883 — John James Lias,  The Atonement Viewed in the Light of Certain Modern Difficulties
 1884 — Thomas George Bonney, The Influence of Science on Theology
 1885 — William Cunningham,  S. Austin and his Place in the History of Christian Thought
 1886 — John de Soyres, Christian Reunion
 1887 — Joseph Hirst Lupton, "Misrepresentations of Christianity," not published
 1888 — Henry Major Stephenson, Christ the Life of Men
 1889 — Edward George King, The "Asaph" Psalms in their Connexion with the Early Religion of Babylonia
 1890 — John Llewelyn Davies, Order and Growth: as involved in the spiritual constitution of human society
 1891 — Arthur Temple Lyttelton,  The Place of Miracles in Religion
 1892 — John Bickford Heard, Alexandrian and Carthaginian Theology Contrasted
 1893 — Mandell Creighton, Persecution and Tolerance
 1894 — Alfred Barry, The Ecclesiastical Expansion of England in the growth of the Anglican Communion
 1895 — William Moore Ede, The Attitude of the Church to some of the Social Problems of Town Life
 1896 — Samuel Cheetham,  The Mysteries, Pagan and Christian
 1897 — James Edward Cowell Welldon, The Hope of Immortality
 1898 — James Wilson, The Gospel of the Atonement
 1899 — Arthur James Mason, Purgatory; The State of the Faithful Departed; Invocation of Saints
 1900 — Fredrick Henry Chase  The Credibility of the Book of the Acts of the Apostles

1901–1925
 1901 — Frederick Robert Tennant, The Origin and Propagation of sin
 1902 — F. J. Foakes Jackson, Christian Difficulties in the Second and Twentieth Centuries: A Study of Marcion and his Relation to Modern Thought
 1903 — William Allen Whitworth, Christian thought on present-day questions
 1904 — Charles William Stubbs,  The Christ of English Poetry
 1905 — Henry Joseph Corbett Knight, The Temptation of Our Lord: Considered as related to the ministry and as a revelation of his person
 1906 — James Pounder Whitney, The Episcopate and the Reformation: Our Outlook
 1907 — John Howard Bertram Masterman, The Rights and Responsibilities of National Churches
 1908 — John Neville Figgis, The Gospel and Human Needs
 1909 — W. Edward Chadwick, Social Relationships in the Light of Christianity
 1910 — Ernest Arthur Edghill, The Revelation of the Son of God: Some questions and considerations arising out of a study of second century Christianity 
 1911 — Reginald James Fletcher, Dei Christus, Dei verbum
 1912 — H. Latimer Jackson, The Eschatology of Jesus
 1913 — William Leighton Grane, Church Divisions and Christianity
 1914 — Hugh Fraser Stewart, The Holiness of Pascal
 1915 — Herbert A. Watson, The Mysticism of S. John's Gospel
 1916 — Arthur Stuart Duncan Jones, Ordered Liberty: or, An Englishman's belief in his church
 1917 — John Owen Farquhar Murray, The Goodness and Severity of God
 1918 — Francis Ernest Hutchinson, Christian Freedom
 1919 — Alexander Nairne, The Faith of the New Testament.
 1920 — Philip Napier Waggett, Knowledge and Virtue
 1921 — Leonard Elliott Elliot-Binns, Erasmus the Reformer: A Study in Restatement
 1922 — Charles Frank Russell, Religion and Natural Law.
 1923 — Stewart Andrew McDowall, Evolution, Knowledge and Revelation 
 1924 — Alan Coates Bouquet, The Christian religion and its competitors to-day.
 1925 — William Ralph Inge The Platonic Tradition in English Religious Thought

1926–1945
 1926 — Charles E. Raven, The Creator Spirit: A Survey of Christian Doctrine in the Light of Biology, Psychology and Mysticism 
 1927 — Edmund Gough de Salis Wood, not published
 1929 — Charles Archibald Anderson Scott, New Testament Ethics: An Introduction 
 1931 — Allan John Smith Macdonald, Authority And Reason In The Early Middle Ages
 1933 — Herbert George Wood, Christianity and the nature of history.
 1936 — John Martin Creed, The Divinity of Jesus Christ: A Study in the History of Christian Doctrine since Kant 
 1938 — John Burnaby, Amor dei: A Study of the Religion of St. Augustine 
 1939 — Stephen Charles Neill, "The Forgiveness of Sins" (not published)
 1941 — Election suspended
 1942 — Election suspended
 1943 — Election suspended
 1944 — Election suspended
 1945 — Election suspended

1946–1975
 1947 — Edward Chisholm Dewick, The Christian Attitude to Other Religions.
 1949 — William Owen Chadwick, "The Early Medieval Doctrine of the Church" (not published)
 1950 — Robert Henry Thouless, Authority and Freedom: Some Psychological Problems of Religious Belief
 1952 — Laurence Edward Browne, The Quickening Word: A Theological Answer to the Challenge of Islam
 1954 — Henry Chadwick, "Origen"
 1956 — Hendrik Kraemer, A Theology of the Laity 
 1958 — Clifford William Dugmore, "The Doctrine of Grace in the English Reformers" (not published)
 1960 — Peter Runham Ackroyd, Exile and Restoration: a study of Hebrew thought of the sixth century BC 
 1964 — George Frederick Woods, A Defence of Theological Ethics 
 1966 — Peter Richard Baelz, Prayer and Providence 
 1967 — David Lawrence Edwards, Religion and Change 
 1968 — John Arthur Thomas Robinson, The Human Face of God 
 1970 — Kathleen Louise Wood-Legh, "Good Works" (not published)
 1973 — Maurice Frank Wiles, The Remaking of Christian Doctrine

1976–2000
 1975–1976 — Peter Bingham Hinchliff, "The Relationship between Mission and Empire in the Nineteenth Century"
 1977–1978 — Charles Davis, Theology and Political Society 
 1979–1980 — Alan Malcolm George Stephenson, The Rise and Decline of English Modernism 
 1981–1982 — Gordon McGregor Kendal, "The Problem of Pleasure: A Christian Analysis" (not published)
 1983–1984 — David Michael Thompson, Baptism, Church and Society in Modern Britain: From the Evangelical Revival to Baptism, Eucharist and Ministry 
 1985–1986 — David Nicholls, Deity and Domination: Images of God and the State in the 19th and 20th Centuries  and [https://books.google.com/books?id=yAIkxVZJLUoC&pg=PT10 God and Government in an 'Age of Reason'''] 
 1987–1988 — Ingolf Ulrich Dalferth, "A Grammar of Faith" (not published)
 1989–1990 — John Barton, The Spirit and the Letter: Studies in the Biblical Canon. 
 1991–1992 — Sarah Coakley, [https://books.google.com/books?id=dXdGAAAAQBAJ&pg=PR13 God, Sexuality, and the Self: An Essay 'On the Trinity']. 
 1993–1994 — Oliver O'Donovan, The Desire of the Nations 
 1994–1995 – David Brown (theologian)
 1995–1996 — Nicholas Sagovsky,  Ecumenism, Christian Origins and the Practice of Communion. 
 1997–1998 — Brian Murdoch, Adam's Grace: Fall and Redemption in Medieval Literature.  
 1999–2000 — Philip Sheldrake, Spaces for the Sacred: Place, Memory, Identity.  

 2001– 
 2001–2002 — John de Gruchy, Reconciliation: Restoring Justice.  
 2003–2004 — N. T. Wright, Paul: Fresh Perspectives 
 2005–2006 — Ellen F. Davis, Scripture, Culture, and Agriculture: An Agrarian Reading of the Bible. 
 2007–2008 — Hugh McLeod, "Religion and the Rise of Sport in Modern England" (not published)
 2009–2010 — Alister E. McGrath, Darwinism and the Divine: Evolutionary Thought and Natural Theology  
 2011–2012 — Neil MacGregor, "The Cost of the Beauty of Holiness: The spiritual price of the visual tradition in the western church" (not published)
 2013–2014 — Richard B. Hays, Reading Backwards: Figural Christology and the Fourfold Gospel Witness''. 
 2015–2016 — Rowan Williams, "Christ and the Logic of Creation"
 2017-2018 — Marilynne Robinson, "Holy Moses: An appreciation of Genesis and Exodus as Literature and Theology."
 2019-2020 — Walter Moberly, "The God of Christian Scripture"
 2021-2022 — Judith Wolfe, “The Theological Imagination"

See also
 Bampton Lectures

Notes

References
 
 
 
  Includes brief summaries of select lectures from 1820 to 1894.
  Includes a fairly complete list from 1820 to 1893.
  Includes the fullest list for 1820–1979 in its appendix.

External links
 
 
 
 

Christian theological lectures
Lecture series at the University of Cambridge
Recurring events established in 1820
Religious education in the United Kingdom